Starcadia is an EP by Joy Electric. The concept of Starcadia is based upon rides that have existed in Disneyland: Matterhorn Bobsleds, Space Mountain, Starcade, Submarine Voyage, and Carousel of Progress. Musically it was described as "more cosmic and spacey" than the band's prior releases.

Track listing
(all songs written by Ronnie Martin)
 "The Matterhorn" – 2:00
 "Starcadia" – 3:44
 "Dance to Moroder" – 3:14
 "Circa 1978" – 2:04
 "The Carousel of Progress" – 2:26

References

Concept albums
2002 EPs
Joy Electric EPs
Plastiq Musiq EPs